"Only Love" (English) / "Mon meilleur amour" (French) / "Hanyalah Cinta" (Indonesian) is a song recorded by Indonesian singer Anggun. The song was written by the singer alongside Marie Bastide and Gioacchino Maurici for her sixth international album Echoes. "Only Love" and "Hanyalah Cinta" were released as the album's lead single in Indonesia and Malaysia. Both versions were premiered on 100 Indonesian radio stations on 6 April 2012, making Anggun the only Indonesian act in history to enter the local and international charts simultaneously. "Mon meilleur amour" was originally planned as the lead single for the French album Échos. However "Je partirai" was eventually released as the lead single and "Mon meilleur amour" became the second single instead. The single received Platinum Export Award for selling more than 300.500 copies outside France as of 30 September 2011.

Track listing and formats
Digital download
 "Mon meilleur amour" – 4:06

French CD single
 "Mon meilleur amour (New Version)" – 3:11

Indonesian promotional single
 "Only Love" – 4:06
 "Hanyalah Cinta" – 4:06

Charts

References

External links
 Official music video for "Hanyalah Cinta". YouTube
 Official music video for "Only Love". YouTube
 Official music video for "Mon Meilleur Amour". YouTube

2011 singles
Anggun songs
2011 songs
Songs written by Anggun